The IFA Shield is an annual football competition organized by the Indian Football Association West Bengal . The IFA is the governing body of football in the state of West Bengal, came into existence in 1893. Named after the association, the IFA Shield tournament was started in the same year. It is the third oldest football tournament in India, after Durand Cup and Trades Cup, and the one of the oldest football competitions in the world.

The royal houses of Patiala and Cooch Behar, A.A. Apcar of Armenian Club and J Sutherland of Dalhousie AC had financially contributed for the inception of the Shield. The coveted shield was designed by Walter Locke & Co. (Calcutta) and constructed by Messrs Elkington & Co. (London). 

During the initial years of the competition, the IFA Shield was dominated by British Army teams and the Royal Irish Rifles defeated W.D.R.A. to lift the first IFA Shield in 1893. However, their stranglehold over the Shield was broken in 1911, when Mohun Bagan AC became the first all-Indian side to win the IFA Shield by defeating East Yorkshire Regiment by 2–1. That was a historic moment for Indian football as well the struggle for independence, as the natives beat the Englishmen in their own game. While the Royal Irish Rifles remains the most successful British Army side with 5 titles, East Bengal Club has won the IFA Shield a record 29 times.

From 2015 to 2018, the IFA Shield was designed as an youth tournament wherein youth teams of all divisions were allowed to participate. The decision was taken by IFA due to busy schedule of AIFF which includes Indian Super League, I-League, I-League 2nd Division, State leagues and Super Cup among others. In 2020, the tournament was once again organised as a senior event.

Results

Pre-independence era (1893–1947)

Post-independence era (1948–present)

Notes:
1. Tournament not held.
2. Joint winners.
3. Abandoned.
4. Abandoned midway as Mohammedan Sporting refused to continue. Awarded to East Bengal.
5. Abandoned due to rain during the replay. Mohun Bagan refused to play again and were scratched. Due to Mohun Bagan walkover, the Shield was awarded to East Bengal.
6. Abandoned after 35 minutes as Palmeiras started a brawl on the pitch, match cancelled. Shield was awarded to East Bengal. Palmeiras have been scratched from the record books.
7. Final abandoned.
8. An all-Indian side wins the Shield for the 1st time
9. Organised as an Under-19 tournament
10. Abandoned.
11. Awarded to Indian Culture League as East Bengal played with an unregistered player in the final.
12. Abandoned due to dispute among finalists over extra time.

Performance by teams

Performance by Indian teams
Though the tournament was dominated by the British Army teams during its initial years, yet British Indian teams too participated representing India prior to the independence, but very few were an all-Indian side. Mohun Bagan AC was the first all-Indian side to win the tournament in 1911.

Top 10 Indian teams in IFA Shield

Performance by Overseas teams
Winners:
 Club Atlético Peñarol (1985)
 Pakhtakor Tashkent FK (1993)
 Finance and Revenue FC (2004)
 FC Bayern Munich II (2005)
 
Runners-up:
 PAS Tehran FC (1970)
 Pyongyang SC (1973)
 FC Ararat Yerevan (1978)
 FC Shakhtar Donetsk (1985)
 Irtysh Pavlodar FK (1993)
 Mohammedan SC (1995)
 Al-Karkh SC (1996)
 Palmeiras B (2001)
 Santos FC (2008)
 Sheikh Jamal Dhanmondi Club (2014)

Awards
Since the 123rd edition of the tournament, the awards for the Best Coach of the tournament, the Best Player of the tournament, the highest goalscorer of the tournament and Fair Play has been renamed in honour of India's football icons- P. K. Banerjee, Chuni Goswami and Krishanu Dey, and renowned sports photojournalist – Ronojoy 'Ronny' Roy.

Krishanu Dey Memorial Award

P. K. Banerjee Memorial Award for the Best Coach

Chuni Goswami Memorial Award for the Best Player

Ronny Roy Fair Play Award

See also
List of oldest football competitions

References

Bibliography

External links
 India - List of IFA Shield Finals, rsssf.com
 The Glorious History Of IFA Shield By Somnath Sengupta, thehardtackle.com

 
Football cup competitions in India
Football competitions in Kolkata
1893 establishments in India
Recurring sporting events established in 1893